Prince of Darkness may refer to:

Religion and mythology
 Prince of Darkness (Manichaeism), the term used by Mani for the principle of evil
 Prince of Darkness (Satan), a term used in John Milton's poem Paradise Lost referring to Satan as the embodiment of evil

People 
 Jeremiah G. Hamilton (1806–1875), Broker & The first black millionaire in New York. 
 Miles Davis (1926–1991), jazz musician
 Bill Demchak (born 1962), American banker and CEO of PNC Financial Services
William F. Galvin (born 1950), Secretary of the Commonwealth of Massachusetts since January 1, 1995
 General Sir Mike Jackson (British Army officer) (born 1944), Chief of British General Staff, commander of KFOR military administration of Kosovo
 Warren Kinsella (born 1960), Canadian political consultant and former PMO staffer to Prime Minister Jean Chretien
 Lord Mandelson (born 1953), former British Cabinet Minister and First Secretary of State
 Robert Novak (1931–2009), American journalist and conservative commentator
 Ozzy Osbourne (born 1948), British rock singer and television personality
 Richard Perle (born 1941), American assistant Secretary of Defense during the Reagan administration
 Gordon Willis (1931–2014), cinematographer famous for his work on The Godfather films

Literature
 The Prince of Darkness, the subtitle of Monsieur, the first book of Lawrence Durrell's 1974 The Avignon Quintet
 Count Dracula, the title character of Bram Stoker's 1897 gothic horror novel Dracula

Film and television

Films
 Dracula: Prince of Darkness, a 1966 horror film by Terence Fisher
 Martian Successor Nadesico: The Motion Picture – Prince of Darkness, a 1998 anime film directed by Tatsuo Satō
 Prince of Darkness (film), a 1987 horror film by John Carpenter

Television
 "Prince of Darkness", an episode of American television series Law & Order

Music

Albums 
 Prince of Darkness (Alice Cooper album) or the 1987 title song (see below), 1989
 Prince of Darkness (Big Daddy Kane album) or the title song, 1991
 Prince of Darkness (Nosferatu album), 1996
 Prince of Darkness (Ozzy Osbourne album), 2005
 Prince of Darkness (soundtrack), by John Carpenter from the 1987 film

Songs 
 "Prince of Darkness", by Alice Cooper from Raise Your Fist and Yell, 1987
 "Prince of Darkness", by Bow Wow Wow from See Jungle! See Jungle! Go Join Your Gang Yeah, City All Over! Go Ape Crazy!, 1981
 "Prince of Darkness", by the Indigo Girls from Indigo Girls, 1989
 "Prince of Darkness", by Lucifer's Friend from ...Where the Groupies Killed the Blues, 1972
 "Prince of Darkness", by Megadeth from Risk, 1999
 "Prince of Darkness", by Miles Davis from Sorcerer, 1967

See also 
 Dark Lord (disambiguation)
 Prince of Light (disambiguation)
 Phil, the Prince of Insufficient Light, a supernatural being in Scott Adams' comic strip Dilbert
 The Undertaker (born 1965), professional wrestler, called "Lord of Darkness"

Nicknames
Nicknames in music